They Forgot is a mixtape by American hip hop recording artist Lil Durk. It was released on November 26, 2016, by Only the Family. The mixtape features guest appearances from Lil Reese, Meek Mill, Mozzy, OTF Ikey, 21 Savage, Hypno Carlito, Dej Loaf, YFN Lucci, and BJ the Chicago Kid. While the production was handled by C-Sick, ChopSquad DJ, Donis Beats, DP Beats, LeekeLeek, Kid Wonder, London on da Track, TY Made It, and Young Chop. The mixtape is supported by the single "Baller".

Track listing

References

2016 mixtape albums
Albums produced by C-Sick
Albums produced by London on da Track
Albums produced by Young Chop
Lil Durk albums